is a passenger railway station located in the town of Nahari, Aki District, Kōchi Prefecture, Japan. It is operated by the third-sector Tosa Kuroshio Railway with the station number "GN21".

Lines
It is the eastern terminus for the Asa Line and all trains, both rapid and local, stop and turn back at the station.

Layout
The station consists of a side platform serving a single elevated track. The station building built into the elevated structure houses a waiting area, a restaurant and a ticket window. Access to the platform is by a flight of steps or an elevator. There is a designated parking area for bicycles under the elevated structure and bike rentals are available from the station. Parking for cars is available at the station forecourt. The station building is also a designated tsunami evacuation area.

Adjacent stations

Station mascot
Each station on the Asa Line features a cartoon mascot character designed by Takashi Yanase, a local cartoonist from Kōchi Prefecture. The mascot for Nahari Station is a girl in a station master's uniform named  .

History

Passenger statistics
In fiscal 2011, the station was used by an average of 358 passengers daily.

Surrounding area
Nahari Town Office
Nahari Town Health Center
Nahari Municipal Nahari Elementary School
Nahari Town Nahari Junior High School

See also 
List of railway stations in Japan

References

External links

Nahari Station (Tosa Kuroshio Railway) 

Railway stations in Kōchi Prefecture
Railway stations in Japan opened in 2002